Jouko Juhani Järvinen (9 May 1935 – 31 May 1984) was a Finnish speed skater. He competed in the 1956, 1960 and 1964 Olympics with the best result of fourth place over 1500 m in 1956 and fifth in 1960. In 1959 he won a world title, placing second at the European championships. The same year he set a world record over 1500 m (2:06.3) and was elected Finnish Sportspersonality of the year. His world record stood for seven years.

Järvinen stayed on top of the Adelskalender ranking table during two periods in 1959 and 1960. His son Timo also became an Olympic speed skater.

Source: SpeedSkatingStats.com

References

1935 births
1984 deaths
Finnish male speed skaters
Olympic speed skaters of Finland
Speed skaters at the 1956 Winter Olympics
Speed skaters at the 1960 Winter Olympics
Speed skaters at the 1964 Winter Olympics
World record setters in speed skating
World Allround Speed Skating Championships medalists